Old Irish was affected by a series of phonological changes that radically altered its appearance compared with Proto-Celtic and older Celtic languages (such as Gaulish, which still had the appearance of typical early Indo-European languages such as Latin or Ancient Greek). The changes occurred at a fairly rapid pace between 350 and 550 CE.

Summary of changes

A capsule summary of the most important changes is (in approximate order):

 Syllable-final  (from PIE) assimilated to the following phoneme, even across word boundaries in the case of syntactically connected words.
 Voiceless stops became voiced:    > .
 Voiced stops became prenasalised . They were reduced to simple nasals during the Old Irish period.
 Before a vowel,  was attached to the beginning of the syllable.
 Lenition of all single consonants between vowels. That applied across word boundaries in the case of syntactically connected words.
 Stops became fricatives.
  became  (later lost unless the following syllable was stressed).
  was eventually lost (much later).
  became a nasalised continuant (perhaps  or ).
 Extensive umlaut ("affection") of short vowels, which were raised or lowered to agree with the height of following Proto-Celtic vowels.
 Palatalization of all consonants before front vowels.
 Loss of part or all of final syllables.
 Loss of most interior vowels (syncope).

They led to the following effects:
 Both the palatalised ("slender") and lenited variants of consonants were phonemicised, multiplying the consonant inventory by four (broad, broad lenited, slender, slender lenited). Variations between broad and slender became an important part of the grammar:
 in masc. -stems:  "son" (nom. acc.) vs.  (gen.),  "back" (nom. acc.) vs.  (gen.), cf. Latin  (nom.),  (acc.) vs.  (gen.);
 in fem. -stems:  "tribe, people" (nom.) vs.  (acc. dat.),  "pig" (nom.) vs.  (acc. dat.);
 in -stems:  "father" (gen.) vs.  (nom. acc. dat.).
 Lenition and nasal assimilation across word boundaries in syntactically connected words produced extensive sandhi effects (Irish initial mutations). The variations became an important part of the grammar.
 Both umlaut (vowel affection) and especially syncope radically increased the amount of allomorphy found across declensions and conjugations. The most dramatic deviations are due to syncope: compare  "they say" vs.  "they do not say" or  "he surpasses" vs.  "he does not surpass" (where the stressed syllable is boldfaced).

Examples of changes 
The following are some examples of changes between Primitive Irish and Old Irish.
{| class="wikitable"
! Primitive Irish !! Old Irish !! Meaning
|-
|  ||  || daughter
|-
|  ||  || priest
|-
|  ||  || son (gen.)
|-
|  ||  || poet (gen.)
|-
|  ||  || genitive of Lug(u)id (name)
|-
|  ||  || genitive of Anblamath (name)
|-
|  ||  || genitive of name
|}

Allomorphy 
These various changes, especially syncope, produced quite complex allomorphy, because the addition of prefixes or various pre-verbal particles (proclitics) in Proto-Celtic changed the syllable containing the stress: According to the Celtic variant of Wackernagel's law, the stress fell on the second syllable of the verbal complex, including any prefixes and clitics. By the Old Irish period, most of this allomorphy still remained, although it was rapidly eliminated beginning in the Middle Irish period.

Among the most striking changes are in prefixed verbs with or without pre-verbal particles. With a single prefix and without a proclitic, stress falls on the verbal root, which assumes the deuterotonic ("second-stressed") form. With a prefix and also with a proclitic, stress falls on the prefix, and the verb assumes the prototonic ("first-stressed") form. Rather extreme allomorphic differences can result:

{| class="wikitable"
|+ Example differences between deuterotonic and prototonic forms of various verbs. Stress falls directly after the center dot or hyphen.
! Earlier form !! Deuterotonic !! Meaning !! Prototonic !! Meaning
|-
|  < PIE *-bʰeronti ||   || they say ||  || they do not say
|-
|  ||  || he rests ||  || he does not rest
|-
|  ||  || he surpasses ||  || he does not surpass
|-
|  < PIE *-logʰeyeti ||  || he pardons ||  || he does not pardon
|-
| ...||  || he may do ||  || he may not do
|}

The following table shows how these forms might have been derived:

{|class="wikitable"
|+Possible derivation of some verbal forms
! !! "they say" !! "they do not say" !! "he rests" !! "he does not rest" !! "he surpasses" !! "he does not surpass"
|-
! Post-PIE
| eks bʰeronti || nē eks bʰeronti || kom uks h₂eneh₂ti || nē kom uks h₂eneh₂ti || dē pro uks skokeyeti || nē dē pro uks skokeyeti
|-
! Proto-Celtic
| eks ˈberonti || nī ˈeks-beronti || kom ˈuks-anāti || nī ˈkom-uks-anāti || dī ˈɸro-uks-skokīti || nī ˈdī-ɸro-uks-skokīti
|-
! Early Irish
| ess-es ˈberont || ní-s ˈess-beront || kon-es ˈuss-anát || ní-s ˈkom-uss-anát || dí-s ˈro-uss-skokít || ní-s ˈdi-ro-uss-skokít
|-
! Nasal assimilation
| ess-es ˈberodd || ní-s ˈess-berodd || — || — || — || —
|-
! Lenition
| es-eh ˈberod || Ní-h ˈes-berod || kon-eh ˈus-anáθ || Ní-h ˈkow̃-us-anáθ || dí-h ˈRo-us-skoxíθ || Ní-h ˈdi-ro-us-skoxíθ
|-
! Palatalization
| es-eh ˈbʲerod || Nʲí-h ˈes-bʲerod || — || Nʲí-h ˈkow̃-us-anáθ || dʲí-h ˈRo-us-skoxʲíθ || Nʲí-h ˈdʲi-ro-us-skoxʲíθ
|-
! Hiatus reduction
| — || — || — || — || dʲí-h ˈRós-skoxʲíθ || Nʲí-h ˈdʲi-rós-skoxʲíθ
|-
! Umlaut (vowel affection)
| — || — || kon-eh ˈos-anáθ || Nʲí-h ˈkuw̃-us-anáθ || — || Nʲí-h ˈdʲe-rós-skoxʲíθ
|-
! Shortening of absolutely final vowel
| — || — || — || — || — || —
|-
! Loss/assimilation of final consonant(s)
|  es-e bʲ-ˈbʲerod || Nʲí h-ˈes-bʲerod || kon-e h-ˈos-aná || Nʲí k-ˈkuw̃-us-aná || dʲí R-ˈRós-skoxʲí || Nʲí d-ˈdʲe-rós-skoxʲí
|-
! Mora reduction in unstressed final vowel
| es bʲ-ˈbʲerod || — || kon h-ˈos-ana || Nʲí k-ˈkuw̃-us-ana || dʲí R-ˈRós-skoxʲi || Nʲí d-ˈdʲe-rós-skoxʲi
|-
! Consonant assimilation
| es ˈbʲerod || Nʲí h-ˈebʲ-bʲerod || — || — || — || —
|-
! Syncope
| es ˈbʲerod || Nʲí h-ˈebʲbʲrod || kon h-ˈosna || Nʲí k-ˈkuw̃sana || dʲí R-ˈRósskxʲi || Nʲíd-ˈdʲersskoxʲi
|-
! Further consonant assimilation
| — || Nʲí h-ˈebʲbʲrʲod || kon ˈosna || — || dʲí R-ˈRósski || Nʲíd-ˈdʲerskoxʲi
|-
! Unstressed vowel reduction
| es ˈbʲerəd || Nʲí h-ˈebʲbʲrʲəd || — || Nʲí k-ˈkuw̃səna || di R-ˈRósski || Nʲí d-ˈdʲerskəxʲi
|-
! Prepositional modification
| as ˈbʲerəd || — || — || — || do R-ˈRósski || —
|-
! Geminate reduction (non-vocalic-adjacent); sandhi geminate reduction
| as·ˈbʲerəd || Nʲíh-ˈebrʲəd || kon·ˈosna || Nʲí-ˈkuw̃səna || do·ˈRóski || Nʲí-ˈdʲerskəxʲi
|-
! Fricative voicing between unstressed syllables
| — || — || — || — || — || Nʲíd-ˈdʲerskəɣʲi
|-
! Old Irish pronunciation
| as·ˈbʲerəd || Nʲí-h-ˈebrʲəd || kon·ˈosna || Nʲí-ˈkuw̃səna || do·ˈRóski || Nʲí-ˈdʲerskəɣʲi
|-
! Old Irish spelling
|  ||  ||  ||  ||  || 
|}

The most extreme allomorphy of all came from the third person singular of the -subjunctive because an athematic person marker  was used, added directly onto the verbal stem (formed by adding  directly onto the root). That led to a complex word-final cluster, which was deleted entirely. In the prototonic form (after two proclitics), the root was unstressed and thus the root vowel was also deleted, leaving only the first consonant:

{|class="wikitable"
|+Examples of extreme allomorphy of 3rd person singular -subjunctive, conjunct
|-
! rowspan=3| !! colspan=4|Present Indicative !! colspan=4|Present Subjunctive
|-
! colspan=2|Positive (Deuterotonic) !! colspan=2|Negative (Prototonic)
! colspan=2|Positive (Deuterotonic) !! colspan=2|Negative (Prototonic)
|-
! Primitive Irish !! Old Irish !! Primitive Irish !! Old Irish
! Primitive Irish !! Old Irish !! Primitive Irish !! Old Irish
|-
! "he refuses"
|  || 
|  ||  
|  || 
|  ||  
|-
! "he remains over"
|  || 
|  || 
|  || 
|  || 
|-
! "he repeats, amends"
|  || 
|  ˈ || (?? >) 
|  || 
|  || 
|-
! "he can"
|  || 
|  ||  > 
|  || 
| ,  || , 
|-
! "it happens"
|  || ( >) 
|  || ( >) 
|  || 
|  || 
|}

Syncope in detail 
In more detail, syncope of internal syllables involved the following steps (in approximate order):
 Loss of absolutely final short vowels (including those that became final as a result of loss of a final consonant and original long final vowels).
 Shortening of long vowels in unstressed syllables.
 Collapsing of vowels in hiatus (producing new unstressed long vowels).
 Syncope (deletion) of vowels in every other interior unstressed syllable following the stress. If there are two remaining syllables after the stress, the first one loses its vowel; if there are four remaining syllables after the stress, the first and third lose their vowel.
 Resolution of impossible clusters resulting from syncope and final-vowel deletion:
 Adjacent homorganic obstruents where either sound was a fricative became a geminate stop, voiceless if either sound was voiceless (e.g.    > ;     etc. > ).
 Otherwise, adjacent obstruents assumed the voicing of the second consonant (e.g.  > ;  > ;  > ).
    not adjacent to a vowel became syllabic and then had a vowel inserted before them (e.g. "world" <  <  < ;  "sin" < ).
 Remaining impossible clusters were generally simplified by deletion of consonants not adjacent to vowels (such as between other consonants). However, Old Irish tolerated geminates adjacent to other consonants as well other quite complex clusters:   "name" (one syllable),   "widow",   "they are shown".

Destruction of final syllables
Proto-Celtic final syllables were often reduced or deleted by Old Irish times.

Raising of unstressed -es-
Unstressed Proto-Celtic -es- became -is- early on if immediately followed by a vowel. The resulting -is- triggers i-affection on preceding stressed syllables as it evolved into *-ih- and then *-iy- in Primitive Irish before either remaining as -i or undergoing a-affection to -e by Old Irish. This raising of *-es- occurred before the early deletion of final *-i. McCone lists the following examples of this raising:

 In second-person singular forms of verbs:
  "you (sg.) bear" >  >  > Old Irish , conjunct 
 In the declension of neuter s-stems:
  "heavens" >  >  >  >  >  Old Irish  
  "heaven" (dative singular) >  >  >  >  >  >  Old Irish

Deletion of final *-i
The absolute-conjunct distinction in Old Irish non-prefixed verbs is generally explained via the apocope of final *-i in multiple Indo-European primary person-number endings that ended in *-i. This normally happens in the conjunct forms, while in the absolute forms the apocope was blocked due to a succeeding enclitic element. Contrast:
  >  "carries" (absolute form without apocope)
  >  >  >  >  (conjunct form with apocope)

The identification of the enclitic that was used to create Old Irish's absolute verb forms has been subject to controversy. At first, Warren Cowgill and Frederik Kortlandt supposed that the protective enclitic was a particle derived from  "is".  The current mainstream explanation, pioneered by Peter Schrijver in the 1990s, identifies this particle as derived from  "beyond", cognate to Latin  "and". Kim McCone on the other hand refuses to identify any specific particle responsible.

The environment of final i-deletion is also controversial. McCone believes that all final *-i was lost by default, while Schrijver limits the apocope to just after *t, *s and also *k.

Final-syllable syncope between coronal continuants
After the lenition of post-vocalic consonants in unstressed syllables and the apocope of -i, an early Primitive Irish syncope occurred to vowels between two dental fricatives or two rhotics in final unstressed syllables preceded by another unstressed syllable. For dental fricatives, the result of their collision due to the syncope was originally  but would then become  due to a later voicing in the same environment as the syncope. On the other hand, collision of two rhotics over this syncope would result in unlenited rhotic rr. Unlike the main early Irish syncope, this syncope could never palatalise the resulting consonant produced by the collision of involved continuants, no matter what vowel was between them. Instances of this syncope include:

  >  >  >  "is brought/given" (prototonic)
  >  >  >  "(s)he prays"
  >  >  >  "runs" (when two or more prefixes come between the stressed syllable of a derived verb and the verb root)

General final-syllable reductions in Primitive Irish
McCone envisions the evolution of final syllables across Primitive Irish into Old Irish as follows.

Proto-Celtic unstressed long vowels were shortened unless protected by a following Primitive Irish final *-h, whether that *-h came from a final -s (as in several nominal inflectional endings) or -ti (as in 3rd-person singular present forms of verbs). These shortened long vowels included the feminine ā-stem nominative singular ending *-ā and the masculine and neuter o-stem ending *-ī.

Then, absolutely word-final -h, vowels, and nasals caused initial mutations if possible, possibly by resegmentation onto the following word.  Any remaining final-syllable short vowels, -h, and nasals after this stage are deleted, while remaining final long vowels (which were subsequently shortened in Old Irish) remained. It is also apparent in Ogham inscriptions that final-syllable Proto-Celtic *o had become *a by Primitive Irish before its loss.

In the following table, the cover symbol C refers to any consonant.

Anaptyxis before final sonorants
After the general final-syllable deletion processes, newly word-final consonant clusters ending in sonorant consonants like liquids and nasals in early Irish that were not simplified with compensatory lengthening gained a schwa between the sonorant and the rest of the cluster. The schwa was often rendered with rounded vowel letters like o or u in early texts if next to a labial consonant. For instance:

  >  >  >  "plough"
  >  >  >  "word"
  >  >  >  "world"
  >  >  >  "wish, desire"

Voicing of obstruents in unstressed syllables
Voiceless obstruents, including voiceless stops and voiceless fricatives, were often voiced word-initially and word-finally in unstressed syllables. Each type of voiceless obstruent however had different triggers for them being voiced. These voicings occurred around AD 700. These voicings are collectively labelled McCone's law by David Stifter after their main formulator Kim McCone.

Dental obstruent voicing
Dental obstruents  were voiced in word-initial and word-final unstressed syllables, in addition to between two unstressed syllables. This wave of voicing is also believed to underlie the voicing of t- to d- in proclitics.
  >  "has been swallowed"
  >  "denial"
  varied with  "fulfils" (conjunct)

Voicing of f to 
The voicing of f has been believed to occur in near-identical environments to the voicing of dentals. Schrijver and McCone think the voicing of f could also happen word-finally in stressed syllables as well, but Stifter is not confident in the evidence.
  >  >  >  "excellence" (but Stifter thinks it may have spread from its use as a conjunction)
  >  varying with  "your (pl.)"

Voicing of 
Palatalised voiceless velar fricatives  became their voiced counterparts  word-finally and between unstressed vowels.
  >  "madmen" (nominative singular )
  >  "prosperity"

This voicing of palatalised velar fricatives created paradigmatic alternations in noun declension where final voiceless unpalatalised velar fricatives alternated with voiced palatalised voiced velar fricatives.

Changes to Proto-Celtic stressed short vowels 

All five Proto-Celtic short vowels survived into Primitive Irish more or less unchanged in stressed syllables.

During approximately A.D. 450-550 (just before the Old Irish period, c. 600-900), however, there occurred several vowel-changes (umlauts). Former vowels are modified in various ways depending on the following vowels (or sometimes surrounding consonants). The mutations are known in Celtic literature as affections or infections such as these, the most important ones:
It does not happen when the vowels are separated by voiceless consonants or certain consonant groups.
It is assumed that at the point the change operated, -vowels that were later lost were short  while those that remain were long .

Nominal examples (reconstructed forms are Primitive Irish unless otherwise indicated):
  "old (nominative singular)" < , but  "old (genitive singular)" <  (-affection),  "old (dative singular)" <  (-affection and -affection) <  < PIE ,  "old (accusative plural)" <  (-affection but no -affection because  remains) < PIE .
  "man (nominative singular)" < Archaic Irish  (-affection) <  , but  "man (genitive singular)" <  (no -affection),  "man (dative singular)" <  (-affection) <  < PIE ,  "men (accusative plural)" <  (no -affection because the  remains) < PIE .
  "strength (nominative singular)", but  "strength (dative singular)" <  (-affection but no -affection, which was blocked by the cluster ) <  < PIE .
  "honey" (-affection) < PCelt ,  "sweet" <  (-affection).
  "miracle (nominative singular)" <  (-affection; from Latin ),  "miracle (nominative plural)" < .

Verbal paradigm example:

{|class="wikitable"
! !! form !! Pronunciation !! Meaning !! Prim Irish !! Post-PIE !! Comments
|-
| Absolute 1sg ||  ||  || "I carry" ||  ||  + -s || -affection
|-
| Absolute 2sg ||  ||  || "you (sg.) carry" ||  ||  + -s || -affection (unstressed *-es- > *-is- in Primitive Irish, also found in -stems)
|-
| Absolute 3sg ||  ||  || "he carries" ||  ||  + -s || Unstressed  =  with surrounding palatalised consonants; see #Orthography
|-
| Conjunct 1sg ||  ||  || "I carry" ||  <  ||  || -affection + -affection
|-
| Conjunct 2sg ||  ||  || "you (sg.) carry" ||  <  ||  || -affection (unstressed *-es- > *-is- in Primitive Irish)
|-
| Conjunct 3sg ||  ||  || "he carries" ||  <  ||  ||  in  signals palatalisation of following consonant; see #Orthography
|}

However, note the cases of  vs.  above for which -affection, but not -affection, was blocked by an intervening .

Stressed front vowels in hiatus
Stressed short front vowels in hiatus underwent a loop throughout Primitive Irish and early Old Irish in which they would repeatedly switch between i and e. McCone outlines the loop as follows:

 Primitive Irish *i before a hiatus then underwent a-affection normally, lowering it down to *e.
 In early Old Irish, stressed *e before a hiatus raised again to i if the hiatus avoided syncope. If syncope had removed the hiatus, the e was not raised.

Examples of words that went through this loop include:
 The a-subjunctive paradigm of  "to buy". 
 The 3rd-person plural conjunct  >  >  >  showcases a full loop.
 The 3rd-person plural relative  >  >  >  shows Step 3 being skipped due to syncope deleting the hiatus that triggered the verb's progress in the loop.
 The declension of  "whitethorn", where Step 1 is inapplicable.
 The nominative singular  >  >  >  >  shows apocope destroying a hiatus, leading to Step 3 being skipped.
 The genitive singular  >  >  >  >  >  shows a completed cycle with Steps 2 and 3 undergone.

Short vowels before nasals and stops
Proto-Celtic *a before nasals followed by a stop manifested as the allophone  in the prehistory of Irish.

  "100" <  and  "death" < 
  "path, way" < 
  "lets, leaves" <  (secondarily transferred to the weak verbs)

But a different development of  occurred before nasals followed by voiced stops. According to Schrijver, this  became i when affected by i-affection and a when it was not. McCone however instead believes that i was the default outcome of  before voiced nasals unless a-affection applied, lowering it down to a. Some examples of these developments include:
 Without raising:
  "land" < 
  "crooked" < 
  "in it" < 
 With raising:
  "melodious" < 
  "around" < 
  "fingernail, toenail" < 
  "navel" < 

Additionally,  and *e were also raised to i when followed by a nasal, a voiced stop, and then either *e or a word-final *a followed by a nasal, despite those vowels not triggering i-affection.
  "butter" <  
  "he/she steps (conjunct)" <  <

Rounding of vowels by labiovelars
The rounding of *i also required the following consonant to be palatalised. This rounding occurred after i-affection as  "prays" (< ) faced rounding even though the rounded vowel was originally an *e. Since  "buys" (< ) faced no rounding even though its stressed vowel was originally an *i, the rounding may also have taken place after a-affection as well, but Schrijver does not find the evidence for that to be reliable.

Examples of this rounding process include:
  "wounds, kills" < 
  "pious" < 
  "cauldron" < 
  "worm" < 
  "of a tree" <  (the nominative singular  is secondary)
  "portion" < 

Original *a preceded by a labiovelar consonant and followed by *n and an originally voiceless stop was rounded and then broken into Old Irish  .
  "was wounded" < 
  "fifty" <

Compensatory lengthening after fricatives
After a-affection occurred in Primitive Irish, dental and velar fricatives were dropped when immediately preceding a sonorant consonant, but transformed the preceding vowel into a long vowel or a diphthong. This development affected both stressed and unstressed syllables.

Proto-Celtic long vowels and diphthongs 

Proto-Celtic long vowels and diphthongs develop in stressed syllables as follows:
{|class=wikitable style="text-align: center;"
! Proto-Celtic !! archaic Old Irish !! later Old Irish !! Example(s)
|-
|  || colspan="2" |  ||  (gen. ) "king" (cf. Latin , Sanskrit ) "number" (cf. Old English , Latin  "rite")
|-
|  || colspan="2" |  ||  "mother" (cf. Latin ) "gift" (cf. Latin )
|-
|  || colspan="2" |  ||  "back" (cf. Latin  "ass, buttocks")
|-
|  ||  (spelled  or ) || rowspan="2" | merged (both spellings used) ||  "one-eyed" < PC  < PIE  (cf. Latin  "blind", Gothic  "one-eyed")
|-
|  ||  (spelled  or ) || ,  "one" < PIE  (cf. archaic Latin )
|-
|rowspan=2|  > ē
|rowspan=2| é
|ía
|  "they go" < archaic  < PIE  (cf. Ancient Greek  "to walk", Gothic  'to go up')
|-
|é
| "you go", also from PIE 
|-
|  (+C) > ō || rowspan="2" | ó || rowspan="2" | úa || ,  "singleness" < PC  < IE  "again" +  "that" (cf. Ancient Greek  "self")
|-
|  (+C) > ō || ,  "new" < archaic  < PC  (cf. Gaulish ) < IE  (cf. Gothic ) "tribe, people" < PC  < IE  (cf. Gothic ) "red" < PC  < PIE  (cf. Gothic )
|-
|  (not +C) || áu || rowspan="2" | ó ||  "ear" < archaic ,  < PC  < IE  (cf. Latin ) "ship" < archaic  < PC  < PIE  (cf. Latin )

|-
|  (not +C) || óu > áu ||  'cow' < archaic  < early archaic  (.  700) < PC  (gen.sg.) < PIE 
|}

"druid" <  "tree-knower".

Welsh ) < PIE .

Consonants

Overview 
See Proto-Celtic for various changes that occurred in all the Celtic languages, but these are the most important:
 PIE  > Proto-Celtic  (but PIE  > ).

From Proto-Celtic to Old Irish, the most important changes are these:
 Lenition and palatalisation, multiplying the entire set of consonants by 4. See #History for more details.
 Loss of most final consonants. See #Syncope in detail.
In general, Old Irish  when not word-initial stems from earlier geminate  (often still written as such, especially in archaic sources).
 Proto-Celtic   remain in Ogam Irish ( "son" (gen. sg.)) but become simple  in Old Irish. Occasionally, they leave their mark by rounding the following vowel.
 Proto-Celtic  is lost early on between vowels, followed by early hiatus resolution. In some cases,  combines with a preceding vowel to form a diphthong:  "living, alive" <  <  < . Other instances of  become , which still remains in Ogam Irish. By Old Irish times, this becomes  initially (e.g.  "man" < ,  "lordship" < ), lenited  after lenited voiced sounds (e.g.  "bull" < ,  "widow" < ),  after lenited  (lenited  "sister" < ), and is lost otherwise (e.g.  "two" < , unlenited  "sister" < ).
 Proto-Celtic  becomes  after a consonant, much as in Latin. The vowel  often survives before a lost final vowel, partly indicating the nature of the final vowel as a result of vowel affection:  "heart" (nom. gen. dat.) <    <    < PIE  (e.g. gen. ). After this,  is lost everywhere (after palatalising a preceding consonant).

Initial clusters 
Old Irish preserves, intact, most initial clusters unlike many other Indo-European languages.

Preserved initial clusters:
 , e.g.  "swimming",  "marrow",  "stream",  "shadow, reflection",  "he scratches (out)",  "misery (?)".
 , e.g.  "blood",  "fame",  "nut".
 , e.g.  "sun",  "clear",  "customary".
 , e.g.  "heavy',  "garment",  "jealousy, passion".
 , e.g.  "he climbs",  "he cleaves".
 , e.g.  "land",  "milch".
 , e.g.  "belly",  "flower".

Modified initial clusters:
   > , e.g.  "lordship" < ,  "heather" < .
 / >  (lenited ), e.g.  "sister" (lenited ) <  < PIE .
  > , e.g.  "heel" <  <   "to stand"
 But also irregularly > , e.g.  "I go" <  < post-IE .
 PIE  > Proto-Celtic  > , e.g.  "woman" (gen. sg.) <  < PIE , an extremely archaic noun form.

Palatalization
The palatalized consonants arose in multiple stages. In theories of palatalization, the front vowels are Proto-Celtic e, ē, i and ī.

First palatalization
The first palatalization affected single consonants and sequences of a nasal consonant followed by a homorganic voiced stop. The palatalization depended on not only the vowel after the consonant, but also the vowel before the consonant. The following Proto-Celtic vowel setups were eligible for the first palatalization:
 Any consonant followed by i or ī, with two main exceptions:
 If the vowel before the consonant is ā and the sequence after is not -iy-.
 If the consonant is not coronal and the vowel before it is a stressed rounded vowel.
 A consonant entirely surrounded by any of the following vowels: e, ē, i, ī.

Demonstrations of the first palatalization include:

Second palatalization

After the first palatalization, another palatalization ensued. Final-syllable Primitive Irish front vowels, after merging into a "palatal schwa", forced the palatalization of any consonants preceding them except the consonant cluster cht , which could never be palatalized. Greene labels this stage the second palatalization, while McCone treats this as a substage of the first palatalization.

Third palatalization
The third palatalization entailed any front vowel in a second or fourth syllable of a Primitive Irish word causing the palatalization of the preceding consonants. Like with the final-syllable palatalization, these front vowels were generally assumed to merge into a palatalizing schwa before causing palatalization. 

The following Primitive Irish vowels merged into the palatalizing schwa in second or fourth non-final syllables:
 Front vowels *e, *ē, *i and *ī
 *u before a palatalized consonant
 *ō and *a before a palatalized *s, via an intermediate raising to *u

Other vowels were reduced to non-palatalizing schwas. After syncope regularly removed these vowels, the palatalization (or lack thereof) tended to spread across the resulting consonant cluster.

However, if syncope results in a sonorant becoming surrounded by a consonant before it and a consonant after it, the effects of the third palatalization (or lack thereof) are often overridden by a special set of sound laws, presumed to be caused by the stranded sonorant assuming the role of syllable nucleus until epenthesis occurs before the sonorant.

Dissimilatory deletion of lenited consonants
Lenited fricatives and  straddling the boundary between a stressed syllable and an unstressed one tend to disappear if there is a homorganic consonant near the end of the next syllable. Otherwise a hiatus between the two vowels may be formed instead. 

For the purposes of this sound law,  is treated as if homorganic with s, due to its general origin in lenitions of Proto-Celtic *s.

Some examples of this sound law are given below:
 ,   "-teen" < *deǣg < *dexǣg < *dekank < *dekam-kʷe "and 10" ( deleted before )
   "lend!" < *oeðʲ < *oðeθʲ < *odete < *udete ( deleted before )
   "company" < *koimbiθʲext < *koṽʲimbiθʲext < *kom-ambi-tixtā (lenited m deleted before non-leniting m)
   "protection" < *foisaṽ < *fohissaṽ < *uɸo-sistamus (lenited s deleted before another s)
   "I taught" < *-rochechan < *-ɸro-kekana ( deleted before another )
   "I will sustain (prototonic)" < *folilussū < *uɸo-liluxsū ( deleted before another )

This deletion and diphthong formation happened before syncope. As a demonstration,  ended up syncopating its etymon's third syllable instead of the usual second. This can be explained by the first and second syllables fusing into one syllable due to dissimilatory deletion, making the etymon's third syllable the second syllable at the time of syncope.

Intervocalic clusters 
Many intervocalic clusters are reduced, becoming either a geminate consonant or a simple consonant with compensatory lengthening of the previous vowel. During the Old Irish period, geminates are reduced to simple consonants, occurring earliest when adjacent to a consonant. By the end of the Old Irish period, written  are repurposed to indicate the non-lenited sounds  when occurring after a vowel and not before a consonant.

Cluster reduction involving :
   > unlenited  (normally written ). Note that PCelt , >  >  but    >  like  :   "hundred" < PCelt  (cf.
  > unlenited  with compensatory lengthening of a preceding vowel;  >  >  similarly to  :  "swan" < PCelt  < PIE  (vs. Dutch  "goose").

Cluster reduction involving  :
 Medial    > :  "I am" < PIE .
 Medially,  >  (but  > ,  > ).
  >  ,  >   (but  after an unstressed syllable),  > :   "nest" < PIE  .

Lenited stops     generally disappear before sonorants    , with compensatory lengthening of the preceding vowel. Many examples occur in reduplicated preterites or words with consonant-final prefixes (such as ):
  "I have purchased" < *-xexr < PCelt *-kikra;
  "he heard" <  < PCelt ;
  "number" < ;
  "assembly" <  (cf. Old Welsh ).

However,  survive:  "he perforates" < PCelt ;  "goat" < PCelt  (cf. Welsh );  "shame" < PCelt  (cf. Welsh ).

Any /h/ that ends up in an intervocalic consonant cluster for any reason triggers the devoicing of adjacent consonants in the cluster.
  > *æmbihoweθ > *imbhoi >   "turns around"
  > *dīhlondīh > *dīhlndīh >   "denies"

Reduction of 
  >  >  >  >  (3rd-person singular s-preterite relative suffix)
  >  >  "relating, telling"
  >  >  >  "is" (relative)

*w
Proto-Celtic *w had a complex series of outcomes in Old Irish.
 Word-initially, *w simply underwent fortition to f. For instance,  became  "man".
 Immediately after some consonants, *w became /v/, spelled b. After other consonants, it was deleted. Kortlandt and McCone disagree on which conditions governed transformation into b and deletion. Kortlandt believes that b appeared when a voiced lenited consonant preceded the *w, and if *w came after consonants that were either unlenited or voiceless it was deleted. Meanwhile, McCone instead believes that *w was deleted syllable-initially while *w was transformed into b when the *w is separated from a consonant immediately before it by a pre-Irish syllable boundary.
 Examples of transformation of *w to b:
  >   "widow"
  >   "possession"
 Examples of deletion include:
  >   "high"
  >   "two"
  >   "four"
  >   "sister"
 *w was lost between two unstressed vowels.
  >  "battles"
  "alive" in unstressed position >  "surviving"
 Intervocalically after a stressed vowel, *w persisted for longer until early Old Irish, even outlasting many deleted final syllables and syncopated vowels.
 *w was affected by Greene's second and third palatalisations, which turned it into . If this new  came into contact with a preceding vowel, a diphthong ending in i was formed.
  >  >  "sheep"
  >  >  >  "nine"
  >  >  >   "youth"
 Unpalatalised *w formed u-diphthongs with preceding stressed vowels.
  >  >  >  >  "living, alive"

MacNeill's law
MacNeill's law refers to a sound law before and during the Old Irish period causing the loss of lenition of n and l in final unstressed syllables even though they are etymologically expected to be lenited in that position. A vowel between the trigger consonant and the affected l or n must also be present for the law to apply. However, MacNeill's law often failed to apply if this vowel had been inserted by anaptyxis in the first place instead of coming from an earlier Proto-Celtic vowel.

Changes to proclitics
Proclitics that precede a stressed syllable undergo special sound changes during the Old Irish period.

Initial consonants
Initial s was deleted in proclitics.
  >  "the" (masculine nominative singular)
  "likeliness" (dative singular) became  when used as a preposition or conjunction in pretonic position.

Initial t in pretonic position was voiced to d-.
  (a verb-forming prefix) became  in pretonic position.
  >  "your (sg.), thy"

Vowels
Long vowels merged with their corresponding short vowels in proclitics.
  >  "to, for"
  >  "each, every" (proclitic counterpart of  "everyone", which retained the long vowel)

This was followed by o merging with u, with the resulting vowel spelled with both u and o in Old Irish.
  >  "to, for"
  "now" >  (dummy preverb)
  >  >  (a verb-forming prefix in deuterotonic verbs)
  >  (verbal augmentation prefix)

At the same time, e became a in proclitics, except for e before *nt which instead merged with i with the spelling vacillating between e and i.
  >  >  "I am"
  >  >  "ex-" (in deuterotonic verbs)
  >  >  >  "with"
  >  "between"
  >  "first"

Depalatalisation
Palatalisation was generally lost in proclitics.
  >  "like, as"
  >  "to, towards"

See also
 Old Irish

Notes

References

Old Irish
Sound laws